The Eleanor Roosevelt Monument is a memorial located in New York City's Riverside Park, whose centerpiece is a statue of Eleanor Roosevelt, said to be the first monument dedicated to an American president's wife. Hillary Clinton (First Lady at the time) gave the keynote address at the monument's October 1996 dedication.

Design
The landscape architects Bruce Kelly and David Varnell designed the planted, circular monument, and Penelope Jencks sculpted the statue, boulder, and foot stone. The architect Michael Dwyer designed inscriptions in the surrounding granite pavement (including a quotation from a 1958 speech of Roosevelt's, and one from Adlai Stevenson's 1962 eulogy for her), and a bronze tablet located in the planting bed summarizing her many achievements.

Gallery

References

Monuments and memorials in Manhattan
Outdoor sculptures in Manhattan
Statues in New York City
1996 sculptures
Monuments and memorials to Eleanor Roosevelt
Upper West Side
Riverside Park (Manhattan)